Little Nell may refer to:

 Nell Campbell (b. 1953),  Australian actress, club owner, and singer 
 Nell Trent, fictional heroine of Charles Dickens's novel The Old Curiosity Shop
 Little Nell, a play by Simon Gray

See also
Little Nellie (disambiguation)